Aljoscha (1974 in Hlukhiv, USSR, now Ukraine), born Oleksii Potupin, is a Ukrainian visual artist known for conceptual installations and sculptures based on ideas of bioism, biofuturism and bioethical abolitionism.

Prizes 
 2008 1. Prize in sculpture, XXXV Premio Bancaja Valencia, Spain.
 2009 Art prize "Schlosspark 2009", Cologne, Germany.

Selected solo exhibitions 
 2021
"Vivimos el mejor de los tiempos. Estamos comenzando a construir el Paraíso" (Madrid, Spain)
"Puedo-alimentar-a-los-monos-de-gibraltar"(Madrid, Spain)
"Bioethische Abweichung als Grundprinzip der Paradiesgestaltung“, Johanneskirche, Düsseldorf, Germany

 2020
"Paradise Engineering Is an Epiphany of New Bioethics", MZKM at LAGA 2020, Kamp-Lintfort, Germany
"Miraculous Draught", St. John the Divine, New York, USA
"Durchbruch des Seins in den unbegrenzten Freiraum der Möglichkeiten", Galerie Martina Kaiser, Cologne, Germany

 2019
"Bioethische Funktionslust", Galerie von Braunbehrens, Stuttgart, Germany
"Bioethical Aberrations", Städtische Galerie Sohle 1, Bergkamen, Germany
"Our philosophy determined by biological information processing principles", Marienkirche, Ortenberg, Germany
"Panspermia and Cosmic Ancestry", KWS and Galerie Susanne Neuerburg, Einbeck, Germany
"Geschwindigkeitsbeschleunigung der Evolution", Galerie Maximilian Hutz, Lustenau, Austria
"Alterocentric Eudaimonia", Kunststation St. Peter, Cologne, Germany
"Urpflanze", Goethe-Museum Düsseldorf, Germany
"Modelle der nie dagewesenen Arten", Kunstverein Paderborn, Germany.

 2018
"Peak Experience", Beck & Eggeling Gallery, Vienna, Austria.
"Panspermia", Anna Nova Gallery, St. Petersburg, Russia.
"So long as the mind keeps silent in the motionless world of its hopes, everything is reflected and arranged in the unity of its nostalgia. But with its first move this world cracks and tumbles: an infinite number of shimmering fragments is offered to the understanding. А. Camus", Futuro Gallery & Anna Nova Gallery, Nizhny Novgorod, Russia.

 2017 
"A Biology of Happiness", Kunstraum Dornbirn, Austria.
"The Hedonotropic Force", Galerie Susanne Neuerburg, Germany
"Know Thyself", Donopoulos International Fine Arts, Mykonos, Greece
"The Gates of the Sun and The Land of Dreams"Schloss Benrath, Düsseldorf, Germany.
"The Gates of the Sun and The Land of Dreams", Beck & Eggeling Gallery, Düsseldorf, Germany.
"A Notion Of Cosmic Teleology", Sala Santa Rita, Rome, Italy.
"Early Earth Was Purple", Ural Vision Gallery, Budapest, Hungary.

 2016 
"Iconoclasm and Bioism", Julia Ritterskamp, Düsseldorf, Germany
"Auratic Objects", Donopoulos International Fine Arts, Thessaloniki, Greece.
"From Homo Faber to Homo Creator", Gallery Martina Kaiser, Cologne, Germany.
"Lotophagie", Gallery Anna Nova, St. Petersburg, Russia.
"Archaeen", Gallery Martina Kaiser, Cologne, Germany.
"Bioethics", Gallery Y, Minsk, Belarus.

 2015
"Paradise Engineering", Flora, Cologne, Germany.
"Hadaikum", Gallery Martina Kaiser, Cologne, Germany.
"Animism and Bioism", National Museum of Natural History, Sofia, Bulgaria.
"Funiculus umbilicalis", St. Petri, Dortmund, Germany.
"Synthetic | Elysium", Daab Salon, Cologne, Germany.

 2014
"Bioism", Erarata Museum, St. Petersburg, Russia.
 "Lotuseffekt", Goethe Institut, Sofia, Bulgaria.

 2013
"We love you stars. May you adore us", Galerie Claudia Junig, Cologne, Germany.
"Der ca. 20 Lichtjahre große Nebel enthält Staubsäulen, die bis zu 9,5 Lichtjahre lang sind und an deren Spitze sich neue Sterne befinden", Raum e.V., Düsseldorf, Germany.
"Daidaleia – the presence of fabulous edifices", Donopoulos International Fine Arts, Thessaloniki, Greece.

 2012
"Sensorial Panopticum", Beck & Eggeling Gallery, Düsseldorf, Germany.
"Abiogenesis", Kunstraum d-52, Düsseldorf, Germany.

 2011
"Objekt als Wesen", Kunstverein APEX, Göttingen, Germany.
"Bioism Involved", Kunstgarten Graz, Austria.

 2010
"The children of Daedalus", Donopoulos International Fine Arts, Thessaloniki, Greece.
"Living architectures", Beck & Eggeling Gallery in cooperation with Henn Gallery, Munich, Germany.
"Bioism aims to spread new and endless forms of life throughout the universe", ARTUNITED, Vienna, Austria.

 2009
"Biofuturism", Krefelder Kunstverein, Krefeld, Germany.
"Bioism", Museo di Palazzo Poggi, Bologna, Italy.

 2008
"Objects – Drawings – Paintings", Beck & Eggeling Gallery, Düsseldorf, Germany.

Notes

External links 
 Website of the artist Aljoscha
 Artfacts.net: Aljoscha
 Artsy: Aljoscha
 Aljoscha: Germinating New Art
 Aljoscha biography.
 Galeriemartinakaiser.de/en: Aljoscha
 Salve-magazine.de: Aljoscha
 Annanova-gallery.ru/en: Aljoscha
 Creativemindclass.com: Aljoscha Interview

1974 births
Living people
People from Hlukhiv
Ukrainian sculptors
Ukrainian male sculptors